Brad Lamb may refer to:
Brad J. Lamb (born 1961), Toronto real estate broker and property developer
Brad Lamb (American football) (born 1967), former wide receiver with the Buffalo Bills
Brad Lamb (golfer), Australian golfer in the 2008 Open Championship